Amir Ali Azarpira is an Iranian freestyle wrestler.

He won gold medal in the 97 Kg event at the 2021 U23 World Wrestling Championships held in Belgrade, Serbia.

References

External links 
 

Living people
Sportspeople from Tehran
Iranian male sport wrestlers
Year of birth missing (living people)
21st-century Iranian people